Nikolai Yulievich Kuksenkov (born 2 June 1989) is a retired Russian gymnast who won a silver medal in the team event at the 2016 Summer Olympics. He competed for Ukraine for many years and moved to Russia after the 2012 Summer Olympics in London, where he placed fourth in the all-around and fourth with the team.

Personal life 
Kuksenkov was born on 2 June 1989 in Kiev, Ukraine SSR, Soviet Union. He received Russian citizenship on 23 April 2013.

Career

For Ukraine 
Kuksenkov was a member of the junior Ukrainian team that won team gold at the European Championships. In 2008, he finished 4th in all-around at the 2008 European Championships, Kuksenkov missed qualifying in the Ukrainian Team for the 2008 Summer Olympics because of an injury where he underwent surgery and took a while for the recovery. He won gold in All-around and silver in Horizontal Bar at the 2011 Summer Universiade. He won bronze medal in All-around at the 2011 European Championships.

He competed for Ukraine's national team at the 2012 Summer Olympics in the Men's artistic team all-around and the  Men's artistic individual all-around. The Ukrainian team, consisting of Kuksenkov, Igor Radivilov, Vitalii Nakonechnyi, Oleg Stepko and Oleg Verniaiev finished in 4th place in the team final. They were initially awarded 3rd position although a successful appeal from the Japanese team over one of their athletes scores resulted in Japan being promoted from 4th to 2nd place, displacing Ukraine from the medals. In the individual final Kuksenkov also finished in 4th position, again just missing out on a medal.

For Russia 
In December 2012, Kuksenkov decided to switch to the Russian team for family reasons. Now competing for Russia, he returned to international competition at the 2013 Summer Universiade, in Kazan. Kuksenkov, alongside the Russian team (Emin Garibov, David Belyavskiy, Denis Ablyazin and Nikita Ignatyev) won Russia the team gold medal. He won gold medal in Pommel Horse and defended his All-around title in Kazan winning another gold medal.

On May 19–25, at the 2014 European Championships in Sofia, Kuksenkov contributed scores of 15.133 (pommel horse), 15.066 (rings), 14.866 (parallel bar) and 14.833 (horizontal bar) for Russia and along with teammates (Denis Ablyazin, Aleksandr Balandin, Nikita Ignatyev, David Belyavskiy) won Russia the Team Event gold medal with a total score of 267.959 ahead of Great Britain.
At the 2014 World Championships in Nanning, Kuksenkov also competed along teammates (Denis Ablyazin, David Belyavskiy, Nikita Ignatyev, Daniil Kazachkov and Ivan Stretovich) with Team Russia finishing 5th in the Team Final.

In June 2015, Kuksenkov competed in the 2015 European Games, winning gold in the Team Competition (with teammates David Belyavskiy and Nikita Ignatyev).

In April 2016, Kuksenkov became the subject of turmoil with the news spreading that he had tested positive for meldonium in a failed drugs test. The announcement came a day after he was crowned the Russian National champion, leading to his withdrawal from the remainder of the competition. He was temporarily suspended from Competition, however On April 13, the World Anti-Doping Agency gave amnesty to athletes with the presence of less than 1 microgram of meldonium in doping samples in tests conducted on athletes before March 1, 2016 is acceptable, WADA cites due to uncertainties and lack of studies for how long meldonium stays in the body., his suspension was lifted and he was allowed to train with the Russian Team for the 2016 European Championships.

At the 2016 European Championships in May, Kuksenkov competed on pommel horse (15.066), parallel bars (14.266) and high bar (14.200) to help the Russia team gold with a score of 271.378. He also qualified to the pommel horse final where he finished 5th with a score of 14.566 after a fall.

Kuksenkov won his first Olympic silver medal at the 2016 Summer Olympics in Team event (together with Denis Ablyazin, Nikita Nagornyy, Ivan Stretovich and David Belyavskiy).

In December 2019, Kuksenkov announced his retirement from competitive gymnastics in an Instagram post, stating that he would start working as a coach for the National Russian team.

Competitive history

See also
List of Olympic male artistic gymnasts for Russia

References

External links

Nikolai Kuksenkov Profile 
Nikolai Kuksenkov Sports Bio 
Gymnastics Results
 

1989 births
Gymnasts from Kyiv
Living people
Doping cases in gymnastics
Olympic gymnasts of Russia
Olympic gymnasts of Ukraine
Gymnasts at the 2012 Summer Olympics
Gymnasts at the 2016 Summer Olympics
Russian male artistic gymnasts
Ukrainian male artistic gymnasts
Ukrainian emigrants to Russia
Naturalised citizens of Russia
Gymnasts at the 2015 European Games
European Games medalists in gymnastics
European Games gold medalists for Russia
Medalists at the 2016 Summer Olympics
Olympic silver medalists for Russia
Olympic medalists in gymnastics
Universiade medalists in gymnastics
Russian sportspeople in doping cases
Universiade gold medalists for Russia
Universiade gold medalists for Ukraine
Universiade silver medalists for Ukraine
Medalists at the 2013 Summer Universiade